List of Romanian plays:

0-9 
 ...escu (1933), by Tudor Mușatescu

A 
 A doua conștiință by Barbu Ștefănescu Delavrancea
 A doua tinerețe (1922), by Mihail Sorbul
 A murit Bubi (1948), by Tudor Mușatescu
 A treia caravelă, by Iosif Naghiu
 A treia țeapă, by Marin Sorescu
 Abecedarul, by Dumitru Matcovschi
 Acești îngeri triști (1969), by Dumitru Radu Popescu
 Acești nebuni fățarnici (1971), by Teodor Mazilu
 Acord familiar (1935), by Victor Ion Popa
 Act venețian (1918-1946), by Camil Petrescu
 Adam și Eva (1963), by Aurel Baranga
 Al patrulea anotimp, by Horia Lovinescu
 Alegeri anticipate, by Tudor Popescu
 Amanta mortului or Noua și adevărata Casă cu Țoape (1979-2009), by Puși Dinulescu
 America și acustica (2007), by Vlad Zografi
 American Dream, by Nicoleta Esinencu
 Amoruri anormale (1908-1909), by  Mihail Sorbul
 Anton Pann (1964), by Lucian Blaga
 Apostolii (1926), by Liviu Rebreanu
 Apus de soare (Trilogia Moldovei, 1909) by Barbu Ștefănescu Delavrancea
 Arca lui Noe (1944), by Lucian Blaga
 Arma secretă a lui Arhimede (2003), by Dumitru Solomon
 Ave Maria (1947), by Mircea Ștefănescu
 Avram Iancu (1934), by Lucian Blaga
 Avram Iancu (1978), by Mircea Micu

B 
 Baronulțț, de Mihail Sorbul
 Băiatul cu floarea (1978), by Tudor Popescu
 Bălcescu (1948), by Camil Petrescu
 Bani de dus, bani de-ntors (1999-2001), by Puși Dinulescu
 Banii n-au miros, by Pașcu Balaci
 Bogdan Dragoș, by Mihai Eminescu
 Boală incompatibilă, by Tudor Popescu
 Borgia (1936), by Alexandru Kirițescu
 Boul și vițeii, by Ion Băieșu
 Bunicul și Artre cu litere de platină, de Paul Cornel Chitic
 Burtă Verde (1952), by Tudor Mușatescu 
 Buzunarul cu pâine, de Matei Vișniec
 Bătrânul (1920), by Hortensia Papadat-Bengescu

C 
 Cadrilul (1919), by Liviu Rebreanu
 Caii la fereastră (1987), by Matei Vișniec
 Cantonament buclucaș (1942), by Victor Ion Popa 
 Capul de rățoi (1938), by George Ciprian
 Caragiale în vremea lui (1955), by Camil Petrescu
 Casa cu doua fete (1946), by Mircea Ștefănescu
 Casa de la Miezul Nopții or  Paiața sosește la timp (1993), by Fănuș Neagu
 Casa Mare (1967), by Ion Druță
 Cavalerii Mesei Pătrate, by Tudor Popescu
 Căderea – trei moduri de sinucidere (1993), by Viorel Savin
 Călătorie de vis, by Tudor Popescu
 Ceasul (1916), by Nicolae Iorga 
 Celuloid (1968), by Iosif Naghiu
 Cerul și cârtița (1982), by Ștefan Dumitrescu
 Cezar, măscăriciul piraților (1968), by Dumitru Radu Popescu
 Chirița în Iași sau două fete ș-o neneacă (1850), by Vasile Alecsandri
 Chirița în provincie (1855), by Vasile Alecsandri
 Chirița în voiagiu (1865), by Vasile Alecsandri
 Chirița în balon (1875), by Vasile Alecsandri
 Cine l-a ucis pe Marx? (1998), by Horia Gârbea
 Cîinele-cîrciumar (1925), by Victor Ion Popa
 Cîntec din fluier (1963), by Paul Everac
 Ciuta (1922), by Victor Ion Popa
 Citadela sfărâmată, by Horia Lovinescu
 The Chairs (1952), by Eugène Ionesco
 Cocoșul negru, de Victor Eftimiu
 Comedia zorilor (1930), by Mircea Ștefănescu
 Concurs de frumusețe (1979), by Tudor Popescu
 Conu Leonida față cu reacțiunea (1880), by Ion Luca Caragiale
 Coriolan Secundus, de Mihail Sorbul
 Crinul vieții, de Victor Eftimiu 
 Cronica personală a lui Laonic, de Paul Cornel Chitic
 Cruciada copiilor (1930), by Lucian Blaga
 Cuiul lui Pepelea (1935), by Victor Ion Popa
 Cuminecătura (1925), by George Mihail Zamfirescu

D 
 D-ale carnavalului (1885), by Ion Luca Caragiale
 Dansatoarea, gangsterul și necunoscutul (1958), by Victor Bârlădeanu
 Danton (1924-1925), by Camil Petrescu
 Daria (1935), by Lucian Blaga
 Despărțire la marele zbor (ro) (1982), by Romulus Bărbulescu și George Anania
 Despot Vodă (1880), by Vasile Alecsandri
 Desu și Kant, by Ion Băieșu
 Dezertorul (1917), by Mihail Sorbul
 Dictatorul (1945), by Alexandru Kirițescu
 Dresoarea de fantome, by Ion Băieșu
 Doamna Bovary sînt ceilalți (1993), by Horia Gârbea
 Domnișoara Nastasia (1927), by George Mihail Zamfirescu
 Don Juan moare ca toți ceilalți, by Teodor Mazilu
 Dona Diana, comedie în gustul Renașterii în zece tablouri după Moreto (1938), by Camil Petrescu
 Dona Juana (1947), by Radu Stanca
 Dragoste la prima vedere (1984), by Lucia Verona
 Drum bun, scumpul meu astronaut (1962), by Victor Bârlădeanu 
 Duet (1970), by Andi Andrieș 
 Dulcea ipocrizie a bărbatului matur (1980), by Tudor Popescu

E 
 Elena Dragoș (1863), by Gheorghe Asachi
 The Evangelists (2005), by Alina Mungiu-Pippidi
 Epoleții cu busolă (2005), by Valentin Busuioc
 Eroii noștri (1906), by Mihail Sorbul
 Eu când vreau să fluier, fluier (If I Want to Whistle, I Whistle, 1997), de Andreea Vălean
 Eu hoț, tu hoț, ei bandiți!, by Tudor Popescu
 Europa aport - viu sau mort, by Paul Cornel Chitic
 Există nervi, by Marin Sorescu
 Explozie întârziată (1963), by Paul Everac

F 
 Fantomiada, de Ion Băieșu
 Farsa (1994), by Răzvan Petrescu
 Fata ursului (in Duhul pământului), by Vasile Voiculescu
 Fântâna Blanduziei (1884), by Vasile Alecsandri
 Fântânile (ro) (1988), by Romulus Bărbulescu and George Anania
 Ferestre deschise (1963), by Paul Everac
 Fericire Loto Pronosport, by Tudor Popescu
 Fii cuminte, Cristofor! (1965), by Aurel Baranga
 Fluierând pe Golgota în sus, de Tudor Popescu 
 Florentina  (1925), by Alexandru Kirițescu
 Focurile de pe comori (1923), by Tudor Mușatescu
 Frumos este în septembrie la Veneția, by Teodor Mazilu
 Fugind de Charybdis (1912), by Pompiliu Păltănea
 Funcționarul de la domenii, by Petre Locusteanu

G 
 Gaițele  (1932), by Alexandru Kirițescu
 The Gas Heart (French: Le Cœur à gaz), by Tristan Tzara
Geamandura (1950), by Tudor Mușatescu
 Ghicește-mi în cafea (1938), by Victor Ion Popa
 Ginere de import (1997), by Viorel Savin
 Gluga pe ochi, de Iosif Naghiu
 Goana după fluturi (1967), by Bogdan Amaru
 Grand Hotel Europa (1998), by Lucia Verona
 Greșeala (1997), by Viorel Savin

H 
 Hagi-Tudose (1913), by Barbu Ștefănescu Delavrancea
 Haiducii, by Victor Eftimiu
 Handkerchief of Clouds (1924), by Tristan Tzara

I 
 Iată femeia pe care o iubesc (1943), by Camil Petrescu
 Idolul și Ion Anapoda (1935), by George Mihail Zamfirescu
 Iertarea, by Ion Băieșu
 Inspectorul broaștelor, de Victor Eftimiu 
 Insula, by Mihail Sebastian și Mircea Ștefănescu
 Irinel (1912), by Barbu Ștefănescu Delavrancea
 Ioachim - prietenul poporului (1947), by George Ciprian
 Ioana d'Arc (1937), by Mihail Drumeș
 Iona (1968), by Marin Sorescu
 Isabela, dragostea mea (1996), by Vlad Zografi
 Ispita (1979), by Tudor Popescu
 Ivanca (1925), by Lucian Blaga

Î  
 În căutarea sensului pierdut, by Ion Băieșu
 Încercarea (1936), by Victor Ion Popa
 Întors din Singurătate, by Paul Cornel Chitic
 Înșir-te mărgărite, de Victor Eftimiu 
 Învierea (1925), by Lucian Blaga
 Învierea lui Ștefan cel Mare (1918), by Nicolae Iorga
 Învinșii  (1910), by Alexandru Kirițescu

J 
 Jocul de-a vacanța (1939), by Mihail Sebastian
 Jocul de dincolo de ploaie (1985), by Viorel Savin
 Jocul vieții și al morții în deșertul de cenușă, by Horia Lovinescu
 Jos Tudorache! Sus Tudorache! (1952), by Mircea Ștefănescu

K 
 The Killer (1958), by Eugène Ionesco

L 
 Lamentația fructelor (1994), by Viorel Savin
 Letopiseți (1914), by Mihail Sorbul
 Logodnicul (1978), by Lucia Verona
 Luceafărul (Trilogia Moldovei, 1910) by Barbu Ștefănescu Delavrancea
 Lucruri și ființe (1987), by Viorel Savin
 Lumina de la Ulmi, by Horia Lovinescu

M 
 Macbett (1972), by Eugène Ionesco
 Madona (1947), by Tudor Mușatescu
 Maestrul, by Ion Băieșu
 Mama (1960), by Dumitru Radu Popescu
 Marcel și Marcel  (1923), by Alexandru Kirițescu
 Marele duhovnic, de Victor Eftimiu 
 Matei Millo (Căruța cu paiațe) (1953), by Mircea Ștefănescu
 Mârâiala, by Paul Cornel Chitic
 Mephisto (1993), by Horia Gârbea
 Meșterul Manole (1927), by Lucian Blaga
 Meșterul Manole, de Victor Eftimiu 
 Michelangelo Buonaroti,  de Alexandru Kirițescu
 Micul infern (1948), by Mircea Ștefănescu
 Mielul turbat, de Aurel Baranga 
 Mihai Viteazul (1911), by Nicolae Iorga 
 Milionar la minut!, by Tudor Popescu
 Mioara (1926), by Camil Petrescu
 Mireasa cu gene false, by Dumitru Radu Popescu
 Mironosițele (1938), by Victor Ion Popa
 Mitică Popescu (1925-1926), by Camil Petrescu
 Moara de pulbere (1988), by Dumitru Radu Popescu
 Moartea unui artist, by Horia Lovinescu
Mobilă și durere (1980), by Teodor Mazilu
 Mormântul călărețului avar, by Dumitru Radu Popescu
 Morți și vii (2003), by Ștefan Caraman
 Muntele (1977), by Dumitru Radu Popescu
 Mușcata din fereastră (1929), by Victor Ion Popa

N 
 Năpasta (1890), by Ion Luca Caragiale·
 Nae Niculae (1928), by George Ciprian
 Negru și roșu, by Horia Lovinescu
 Noaptea - o comedie albastră (1989), by Lucia Verona
 Noțiunea de fericire, by Dumitru Solomon
 Nunta lui Puiu (2003-2005), by Puși Dinulescu

O 
 O batistă în Dunăre by Dumitru Radu Popescu
 O casă onorabilă, de Horia Lovinescuâ
 O inspecție școlară, de Dumitru D. Pătrășcanu
 O noapte furtunoasă (1879), by Ion Luca Caragiale
 O sărbătoare princiară, by Teodor Mazilu
 O scrisoare pierdută (1884), by Ion Luca Caragiale
 Occisio Gregorii in Moldavia Vodae tragice expressa (1777-1780), by Samuil Vulcan ?
 Ochiul albastru, de Paul Everac
 Oedip la Delphi (1997), by Vlad Zografi
 Omul care a văzut moartea, de Victor Eftimiu 
 Omul cu mârțoaga (1927), by George Ciprian
 Ovidiu (1890), by Vasile Alecsandri

P 
 Pană Lesnea Rusalim, de Victor Eftimiu 
 Panțarola (1928), by Tudor Mușatescu
 Parada, de Victor Eftimiu 
 Paradis de ocazie (1979), by Tudor Popescu
 Paradisul, by Horia Lovinescu
 Pasărea Shakespeare (1973), by Dumitru Radu Popescu
 Patima roșie (1916), by Mihail Sorbul
 Paznicul de la depozitul de nisip (1984), by Dumitru Radu Popescu
 Pescărușul lui Hamlet (2004), by Puși Dinulescu
 Petru sau petele din soare (2007), by Vlad Zografi
 Petru Rareș, by Horia Lovinescu
 Pisica în noaptea Anului Nou (1971), by Dumitru Radu Popescu
 Piticul din grădina de vară (1973), by Dumitru Radu Popescu
 Plicul (1923), by Liviu Rebreanu
 Povârnișul (1915), by Hortensia Papadat-Bengescu
 Povești cu zîne si amanți (2000), by Lucia Verona
 Praznicul calicilor, de Mihail Sorbul
 Prăpastia (1920), by Mihail Sorbul
 Preșul, by Ion Băieșu
 Prof. dr. Omu vindecă de dragoste (1946), by Camil Petrescu
 Profesorul de franceză (1948), by Tudor Mușatescu
Proștii sub clar de lună (1963), by Teodor Mazilu
 Pygmalion sau aripa frântă a țipătului, de Ștefan Dumitrescu

R 
 Răceala, by Marin Sorescu
 Răzbunarea (1918), by Mihail Sorbul
 Răzbunarea pământului (1938), by Nicolae Iorga 
 Răzbunarea sufleurului (1937), by Victor Ion Popa
 Răzvan și Vidra (1867), by Bogdan Petriceicu Hasdeu
 Râsul (1981), by Ștefan Dumitrescu
 Reclamație, by Ion Băieșu
 Regele și cadavrul (1998), by Vlad Zografi
 Repetabila scenă a balconului (1996), by Dumitru Solomon
 Rezervația de pelicani (1983), by Dumitru Radu Popescu
 Richard al III-lea se interzice (2005), by Matei Vișniec
Rosana (1868), by Bogdan Petriceicu Hasdeu

S 
 Sam, poveste cu mine, cu tine, cu el (1939), by George Mihail Zamfirescu 
 Săru' mâna tanti or Pe pragul despărțirii, de Puși Dinulescu
 Scaunul (1979), by Tudor Popescu 
 Scoica de lemn (1967), by Fănuș Neagu
 Secătura mahalalei (1947), by Mircea Ștefănescu
 Secretul atomic (1997), by Lucia Verona
 Setea Muntelui de sare, a trilogy by  Marin Sorescu: Iona, Paracliserul, and Matca
 Sfântul Mitică Blajinul (1965), by Aurel Baranga
 Shakespeare în infern (1932), by Victor Ion Popa
 Somnoroasa aventură, by Teodor Mazilu
 Sosesc deseară (1931), by Tudor Mușatescu
 The Star Without a Name (Steaua fără nume) (1942), by Mihail Sebastian
 Strămoșii, de Victor Eftimiu 
 Studiu osteologic asupra scheletului unui cal dintr-un mormânt avar din Transilvania (1979), by Dumitru Radu Popescu
 Suflet de fată (1982), by Puși Dinulescu
 Subprefectul by Duiliu Zamfirescu
 Suflete tari (1921), by Camil Petrescu
 Surorile Boga, de Horia Lovinescu

T 
 Take, Ianke și Cadîr (1932), by Victor Ion Popa 
 Tanța și Costel, de Ion Băieșu
 Titanic-Vals (1932), by Tudor Mușatescu
 Toate mințile mele (2011), by Vlad Zografi
 Trandafirii roșii (1915), by Zaharia Bârsan
 Tristețea vânzătorului de sticle goale, by Ion Băieșu
 Tulburarea apelor (1923), by Lucian Blaga

Ț 
Țara fericirii (1946), by Tudor Mușatescu
 Țara lui Abuliu, de Dumitru Solomon
 Terra 2, by Tudor Popescu
 Țușcă, pușcă, pițigoi (1925), by Victor Ion Popa

U 
 Ultima oră, by Mihail Sebastian
 Un haiduc în fustă cadrilată, de Tudor Popescu
 Un lup mâncat de oaie (1947), by George Ciprian
 Uneori liliacul înflorește spre toamnă, by Tudor Popescu

V 
 Vara imposibilei iubiri (1966), by Dumitru Radu Popescu
 Vărul Shakespeare, by Marin Sorescu
 Vârsta zero (1974), by Andi Andrieș 
 Vecinii soarelui (1960), by Andi Andrieș 
 Verbul galben (1968), by Andi Andrieș 
 Veverița (1941–42), by Victor Ion Popa 
 Viața unei femei  (1975), by Aurel Baranga
 Vicleimul (1934), by Victor Ion Popa 
 Victima și călăul, by Pașcu Balaci
 Viitorul e maculatura (1999), by Vlad Zografi
 Viforul (Trilogia Moldovei, 1910) by Barbu Ștefănescu Delavrancea
 Vis (1968), by Dumitru Radu Popescu
 Vis de secătură (1946), by Mircea Ștefănescu
 Visul unei nopți de iarnă (1937), by Tudor Mușatescu 
 Vlaicu Vodă (1902), by Alexandru Davila
 Vreau să cred și n-am un Dumnezeu, by Tudor Popescu
 Vreau să trăiesc (1937), by Ion Minulescu

X 
 XXI scene din viata lui Ștefan, by Ștefan Caraman

Z 
 Zamolxe (1921), by Lucian Blaga
 Zapp (1997), by Ștefan Caraman
 Zăpezile de altă dată(2003), by Dumitru Solomon
 Zece milioane (1941–42), by Victor Ion Popa 
 Zestrea Ilenuței (1953), by Mircea Ștefănescu
 Zodia balanței (1970), by Paul Anghel

Bibliography
 Istoria literaturii române: dramaturgia, Mircea Ghițulescu, Editura Academiei Române, 2007, 918 pages
 Aurel Sasu (ed.), Dicționarul biografic al literaturii române, vol. I, p. 721-22. Pitești: Editura Paralela 45, 2004.

See also

 List of Romanian playwrights

References

Lists of plays